The Saegmuller House is a historic home located in Arlington, Virginia.  It was built between 1925 and 1927, and is -story, stuccoed frame central-hall plan dwelling with Prairie School influences.  It sits on a concrete block foundation and has a pyramidal roof.  It features an original front porch with large piers and columns and a prominent central gable and deep overhanging eaves. The house was once associated with the Saegmuller dairy farms operations.

It was listed on the National Register of Historic Places in 2004.

References

Houses on the National Register of Historic Places in Virginia
Prairie School architecture in Virginia
Houses completed in 1927
Houses in Arlington County, Virginia
National Register of Historic Places in Arlington County, Virginia
Central-passage houses